Gabriel Luis Fernández Arenas (born 10 July 1983), known as Gabi, is a Spanish former professional footballer who played as a defensive midfielder.

He made 429 La Liga appearances, mostly in two spells at Atlético Madrid interspersed with a period at Zaragoza, winning domestic and European silverware with the former. During his ten-year stint at the club, he amassed competitive totals of 414 matches and ten goals. He also competed professionally in Qatar, with Al Sadd.

Gabi represented Spain at youth level.

Club career

Atlético Madrid
Gabi was born in Madrid. A product of Atlético Madrid's youth system, he was seldom used during his debut season with the Colchoneros first team.

After a loan to another club in the capital, Getafe CF, Gabi would make 52 La Liga appearances for the club from 2005 to 2007, scoring his only goal in a 1–1 away draw against RCD Espanyol on 9 April 2006.

Zaragoza
In early February 2007, Gabi joined Real Zaragoza on a €9 million transfer, agreeing to a four-year contract effective as of July. He was an undisputed starter in his first year, but the Aragonese were relegated from the top flight.

Defensive-minded Gabi netted four times in 35 games in the 2008–09 campaign, as his team immediately regained their lost status. In the following season he again was an automatic first choice, helping to a final 14th position.

Again a starter in the 2010–11, only missing matches due to suspension, Gabi scored a career-best 11 goals as Zaragoza again escaped relegation, six from penalties – he was also their captain. On 12 March 2011, he scored twice from the spot in a 4–0 home win against Valencia CF. On 30 April, he converted a penalty in a 3–2 victory away to Real Madrid and, on the last matchday, scored twice from open play in a 2–1 win at Levante UD that secured his team's top-flight status.

Atlético return

On 1 July 2011, Gabi returned to Atlético Madrid on a transfer fee of around €3 million. He scored his first goal for the team on 4 December, in a 3–1 home win against Rayo Vallecano – adding one in his own net– and started most of his first season in his second spell, partnering fellow youth graduate Mario Suárez in defensive midfield.

Gabi played 45 official matches in the 2012–13 campaign, including seven in the club's victorious run in the Copa del Rey, the first in 17 years. He was also selected by manager Diego Simeone as the new captain.

On 17 May 2014, in the away match to FC Barcelona that was the last of the season, Gabi took a 49th-minute corner kick which was headed in by Diego Godín to equalise 1–1, and give Atlético its first league title since 1996. On 4 July, he signed a new contract that kept him at the club until 2017.

In the second leg of a domestic cup quarter-final against Barcelona on 28 January 2015, Gabi was sent off in the tunnel at the end of the first half. His midfield partner Suárez was also dismissed later on, in an eventual 2–3 home defeat. On 7 October 2016 the 33-year-old inked a new contract until June 2018, commenting on the deal: "I always say that playing with Atlético de Madrid was my childhood dream, so I cannot ask for more than what I am living these years."

Gabi scored his first goal of the season – from 49 appearances – on 16 May 2018, netting from close range after an assist from Koke in the last minute of the Europa League final against Olympique de Marseille, a 3–0 win in Lyon.

Al Sadd
Gabi moved abroad for the first time on 2 July 2018, with the 34-year-old signing a two-year contract at Qatar Stars League club Al Sadd SC. He partnered veteran compatriot Xavi in midfield, and won the league in their first season together.

On 15 June 2020, Gabi left the Jassim bin Hamad Stadium. On 29 November, he announced his retirement.

International career
Gabi was selected in José Ufarte's Spain squad at the 2003 FIFA U-20 World Cup in the United Arab Emirates, finishing as runners-up to Brazil. He scored the first goal of their opening game, a 2–1 loss to Argentina in Sharjah.

Style of play
Known for his tackling ability as well as his combativeness and hard work, Gabi could both break down opposition attack and dictate play with the ball with equal effectiveness. He was also known to be proficient when in possession, capable of delivering through balls and distributing the ball at both long and short lengths.

Career statistics

Honours
ClubAtlético MadridLa Liga: 2013–14
Copa del Rey: 2012–13
Supercopa de España: 2014; runner-up 2013
UEFA Europa League: 2011–12, 2017–18
UEFA Super Cup: 2012
UEFA Champions League runner-up: 2013–14, 2015–16Al SaddQatar Stars League: 2018–19
Sheikh Jassim Cup: 2019
Qatar Cup: 2020

InternationalSpain U20'
FIFA U-20 World Cup runner-up: 2003

Individual
La Liga Squad of the Season: 2013–14
UEFA Champions League Squad of the Season: 2013–14, 2015–16
UEFA Europa League Squad of the Season: 2017–18

See also
 List of Atlético Madrid players (+100)
 List of La Liga players (400+ appearances)
 List of Real Zaragoza players (+100 appearances)

References

External links

Atlético Madrid official profile

1983 births
Living people
Footballers from Madrid
Spanish footballers
Association football midfielders
La Liga players
Segunda División players
Segunda División B players
Atlético Madrid B players
Atlético Madrid footballers
Getafe CF footballers
Real Zaragoza players
Qatar Stars League players
Al Sadd SC players
UEFA Europa League winning players
Spain youth international footballers
Spain under-21 international footballers
Spanish expatriate footballers
Expatriate footballers in Qatar
Spanish expatriate sportspeople in Qatar
Outfield association footballers who played in goal